Muhteşem Yüzyıl is a Turkish historical television series created by Meral Okay. The series is based on the life of Suleiman the Magnificent (the longest-reigning sultan of the Ottoman Empire) and his wife, Hürrem Sultan, a former slave who became sultana. It chronicles the power struggles among members of the imperial house.

The series premiered on January 5, 2011, on Show TV. Its first season and 16 episodes of the second season were aired on the channel, and the rest of the series was broadcast on Star TV. Each episode is 90 to 150 minutes long. Producer Timur Savcı said in July 2013 that the series would end in March 2014, but it concluded with 139 episodes on June 11, 2014.

Series overview

Ratings

Episodes

Season 1 (2011)
Süleyman is informed while hunting that his father, Sultan Selim, has died. He rides to Constantinople with his best friend, Pargalı İbrahim, to take the throne. Alexandra, a Ruthenian girl, is kidnapped in a Tartar slave raid; her parents and sister are killed. Sold to the Topkapı Palace in Istanbul, she is accepted into the Sultan's harem. Nigar Kalfa, a harem leader, tells Alexandra the benefits of being a favorite of the sultan and bearing a son if she follows the rules. Alexandra attracts the sultan's attention, spends a night with him, and eventually falls in love with him. After converting to Islam, Süleyman changes her name to Hürrem ("who brings joy to one's face"). She gives birth to her first son, Mehmed, and rises to the head of the court. Mahidevran, mother of Süleyman's eldest son Mustafa, worries when she notices that Süleyman is not spending time with her anymore. A year later, Hürrem gives birth to her daughter, Mihrimah. Süleyman leaves for a campaign in Belgrade and kills the husband of Victoria, who later enters the harem to kill the sultan. Süleyman arranges the marriage of his sister, Hatice Sultan, to a vizier's son, not realizing Hatice and İbrahim are in love. İbrahim resigns as grand vizier to not cause Hatice any pain, but Süleyman orders him back and approves his marriage to Hatice. Leo, Hürrem's fiancé before she arrived in Istanbul, arrives in an attempt to find her. Hürrem learns about his presence after giving birth to her third child Selim. She tries to hide the truth, but İbrahim uses it as against her. Victoria, now renamed Sadika, becomes a trusted servant and eventually tries to assassinate Süleyman, holding a dagger to his throat. Because of the rivalry and developing hostility between İbrahim and Hürrem, he tries to blackmail and poison her. Leo saves her by eating the poisoned Turkish delight and dies.

Season 2 (2011–2012)
Sadıka is thwarted by Süleyman and later killed by Matrakçı Nasuh, who had become fond of her. Hürrem gives birth to her fourth child and third son, Bayezid. Spanish Princess Isabella Fortuna is kidnapped by Turkish pirates and sold to Süleyman, who decides to use her as a bargaining chip. Isabella unsuccessfully tries to escape several times. Hürrem becomes jealous, and gets help to send Isabella to Vienna, where she returns to her monastery. Hatice gives birth to her and Ibrahim's first child, a boy named Mehmed, but accidentally smothers him while breastfeeding at night; she later becomes pregnant with twins. Süleyman allows Hürrem to become involved in charity work in accordance with the Five Pillars of Islam. When he goes to her room at night, she tells him that she cannot sleep with him because she is a free woman and they are not married. Breaking with Ottoman tradition, Süleyman decides to marry her. Süleyman's mother and others consider the marriage unacceptable. Furious, Mahidevran also requests to spend her life as a free woman; Süleyman refuses. Hürrem, who sent an assassin to kill İbrahim, changes her mind and calls off the attack after seeing Hatice's sadness. İbrahim, however, is shot with a poisoned arrow during the wedding ceremony by an archer sent by Behram Pasha. İbrahim becomes seriously ill, and Nigar, Matrakçı, and Sümbül bring him to a hot spring to heal him. Nigar is ordered to marry Matrakçı Nasuh, and is unhappy because she is in love with İbrahim. On her first night in her new home, İbrahim arrives unexpectedly after he and Matrakçı had a deal. Matrakçı divorces her, and she becomes İbrahim's lover. While the sultan is at war, Süleyman's mother and Mahidevran conspire against Hürrem. They plant a spy, and pretend to let Hürrem lead the harem for a while. Hürrem gives birth to her fifth child, Cihangir. During a rebellion incited by the spy, a slave is accused of stealing gold; the innocent girl immolates herself. The slaves take torches and march towards Hürrem's chambers to burn her, but Daye and the guardians save her. After his return, Süleyman tells his mother that she is incapable of leading the harem. His mother, who had discovered the truth about İbrahim and Nigar, has a stroke and later dies. After her death, Hürrem and Mahidevran become rivals for the leadership of the harem. Nigar (pregnant by İbrahim) tries to leave the palace, but Hürrem kidnaps and hides her. Hatice finally realizes that her husband has been unfaithful; she sits down with him, brings in Nigar, and he admits everything about their relationship. Hürrem plots against Mahidevran, making her appear to be the person who ordered a servant to strangle Gülfem Hatun. She succeeds this time, and Süleyman makes Hürrem Sultan the leader of the harem.

Season 3 (2012–2013)
İbrahim's adultery becomes common knowledge. Hatice, who had wanted to divorce him, tries to save their marriage. Nigar gives birth to a child, and is told that her baby was stillborn; Hatice actually sent the child away, and hides the truth from İbrahim and Nigar. Süleyman becomes suspicious of İbrahim, informed about his hunger for power. He executes İbrahim and sends his body to Ibrahim's palace. Hatice, distraught at the death of her beloved, disowns Süleyman. Hatice and Mahidevran plan to kill Hürrem by sending Diana, Mahidevran's servant, to murder her as revenge; however, she begins to serve Hürrem. Şah Sultan, Süleyman's sister, begins to plot against Hürrem. Hürrem convinces Mihrimah to marry Rüstem to form an alliance against Şah and Hatice. Mihrimah gives birth to a daughter, Ayşe Hümaşah. Nigar returns to Istanbul, and joins Şah and Hatice to take revenge on Rüstem. They help Nigar enter the palace of Rüstem and Mihrimah and tell her to kill Rüstem and Hürrem at night; when she sees Mihrimah's daughter, however, she remembers her own daughter and takes the child away. When Rüstem finds her, Nigar gives the baby back, and commits suicide. Mustafa meets the Austrian ambassador, which leads to conflict with Süleyman. After the war is over, Mustafa is sent to govern Amasya. Hürrem receives a fake letter telling her that Selim is seriously ill. She decides to go to Konya to see her son, and is captured and imprisoned. Hatice is revealed to be responsible, and commits suicide before Süleyman can find out where Hürrem is. She dies thinking that she had avenged İbrahim's death by taking Hürrem from Süleyman. Malkoçoğlu Balı Bey finds a lead and follows it to find Hürrem. Mihrimah learns that Şah sent a spy to her palace. She confronts her, threatening to tell her father unless she leaves the city and donates her wealth to Hürrem's charity. Mehmed is murdered by Ilyas, his closest Janissary and a servant of Mahidevran, who transmits a fatal disease to the prince after intentionally injuring him during sword practice. The news reaches Süleyman, who falls into a deep depression. Balı Bey finds and rescues Hürrem, and brings her back to the palace.

Season 4 (2013–2014)
Hürrem returns and plans to ensure that one of her sons ascends the throne. Rüstem is chosen as the new Grand Vizier. When Mehmed dies, the princes are recalled to the capital from their provinces so Süleyman can choose the next governor of Manisa, choosing Selim. A new group of slaves is brought to the palace, including Cecilia Baffo, daughter of a Venetian nobleman. She is chosen by Hürrem, who makes her pledge loyalty to her before sending her to Selim's harem, and changes her name to Nurbanu. Süleyman decides to send Mustafa a kaftan as a sign of respect for his son, but Hürrem orders her servants to secretly poison it. After receiving the gift, Mustafa (who thinks his father wanted to kill him) prepares a campaign and marches on the capital. Janissaries prevent Mustafa's army from entering the capital; he and his father meet at the court, and he tells Süleyman about what had transpired. Süleyman, now reconciled with his son, becomes seriously ill. Mustafa meets Bayezid and Cihangir, and promises that he would never kill them after taking the throne; they support Mustafa as the heir to the throne. Hürrem learns about her two younger sons' intentions, and supports Selim; Rüstem and Mihrimah support Bayezid. Hürrem, with the help of Rüstem and Mihrimah, sends a forged letter from Mustafa to the Persian Shah Tahmasp I plotting against Süleyman. Thinking that Mustafa has betrayed him when he sees his seal on the letter, Süleyman has Mustafa executed. Cihangir, who deeply loved his elder brother, dies of grief. With three of his sons dead, a war for the throne begins between Süleyman's two remaining sons; Selim is supported by Nurbanu, his wife and the mother of his son Murad, while Bayezid is supported by Hürrem; Süleyman favors their elder son, Selim. Hürrem becomes incurably ill, and dies soon after. About a year after their mother's death, Bayezid amasses a large army and goes to war against Selim. Süleyman, angered by Bayezid's actions, agrees to his death; this infuriates Mihrimah. Bayezid and his sons flee to Persia, but they're betrayed by Rüstem and executed by Selim. Before their deaths, Mihrimah avenges her brother's death by having Rüstem executed. Selim is left as crown prince and the only heir to the throne. Furious, Mihrimah leaves the palace but remains one of the most powerful women in the Ottoman Empire. Mihrimah sends Safiye Hatun to Murad's harem, and she quickly becomes his favorite and mother of his child, to Nurbanu's displeasure. Süleyman's health gradually deteriorates, but he decides to go to war one last time to inspire his soldiers. He dies during the battle of Szigetvár, as the Ottomans are victorious.

References

Lists of Turkish drama television series episodes